Shirley Carew Titus (April 28, 1892 – March 21, 1967)  was a nurse educator at the University of Michigan (MA, 1930) and Vanderbilt University School of Nursing. Titus was the executive director of the California Nurses' Association from 1942 until 1956. She successfully advocated for and achieved the first collective bargaining for nurses. In 1982, Titus was inducted into the American Nurses Association Hall of Fame. She died on March 21, 1967. She was survived by her sister, Adele B. Titus.

References

1892 births
1967 deaths
Nursing educators
Teachers College, Columbia University alumni
American women nurses
Vanderbilt University faculty
Educators from California
University of Michigan alumni
20th-century American women
American women academics